Rice noodles, or simply rice noodle, are noodles made with rice flour and water as the principal ingredients. Sometimes ingredients such as tapioca or corn starch are added in order to improve the transparency or increase the gelatinous and chewy texture of the noodles. Rice noodles are most common in the cuisines of East and Southeast Asia. They are available fresh, frozen, or dried, in various shapes, thicknesses and textures. Fresh noodles are also highly perishable; their shelf life may be just several days.

History
The origin of rice noodles dates back to China during the Qin dynasty when people from northern China invaded the south. Due to climatic conditions, the northern Chinese have traditionally preferred wheat and millet which grew in cold weather while the southern Chinese preferred rice which grew in hot weather. Noodles are traditionally made out of wheat and eaten throughout northern China so to adapt, northern cooks tried to prepare "noodles" using rice, thus inventing rice noodles. Over time rice noodles and their processing methods have been introduced around the world, becoming especially popular in Southeast Asia. In India, idi-appam, strings of cooked rice, was known in ancient Tamil country around 1st century AD, as per references in the Sangam literature, according to food historian K. T. Achaya.

The shelf life may be extended by drying and removing its moisture content. Studies of drying rice noodles were conducted by the International Food Research Journal.

Varieties

Round thick varieties 
 Bánh canh — thick Vietnamese noodles. The Vietnamese word bánh refers to items such as noodles or cakes that are made from flour, and canh means "soup."
 Lai fun — a short and thick variety of Chinese noodles, also referred to as bánh canh by Vietnamese
 Nan gyi — large thick round rice noodles used in Burma
 Nan lat — medium thick round rice noodles used in Burma
 Silver needle noodles — a variety of Chinese noodles. It is short, about 5 cm long and 5 mm in diameter. Similar to Lai Fun but has a tapering end resembling a rat's tail. More commonly known as silver needle noodle in Hong Kong and Taiwan, and rat noodle or "mouse tail noodles" in Malaysia and Singapore and Locupan in Indonesia. They are also known as pin noodles. In Thailand they are known as Giam Ee noodles.

Flat thick varieties 
 Bánh phở — thick dried rice noodle used in popular Vietnamese beef noodle soups. Phở uses a common Chinese Rice noodle called "Ho Fun"
 Shahe fen/chao fen/chow fun — wide chinese noodles. Also known as shahe fen / he fen (Mandarin), ho fun, hofoen, hor fun, sar hor fun, etc (Cantonese), kway teow, (literally "ricecake strips" in Minnan Chinese) or Sen Yai
 Migan — type of rice noodle from the Dai people, a Tai cultural group from Yunnan Province, China. It is made from ordinary non-glutinous rice. It is primarily defined by its relatively broad and flat shape
 Juanfen — similar to Migan
 Sen lek — narrow flat rice noodle in Thailand Used in such dishes as pad thai, Sukhothai rice noodles and in noodle soups. Its full name would be kuaitiao sen lek
 Nan byar — flat rice noodles used in Burma byar/pyar means flat.
 San see — sticky flat rice noodles from Shan State of Burma
 Guay jub / kuay jab / kuai chap — Thai rolled rice chips or rice flake sheets

Thin varieties 
 Khanom chin — fresh, thin rice noodles in Thai cuisine which are made from rice sometimes fermented for three days, boiled, and then made into noodles by extruding the resulting dough through a sieve into boiling water. Burmese mont bat (မုန့်ဖတ်) or mont di (မုန့်တီ), are similar to this.
 Rice vermicelli — thin strips, sometimes referred to as rice sticks. Also known as bí-hún, bīfun, bíjon or bihon, bee hoon, bihun, num banh chok, bún, mee hoon, Sevai and Sen Mee

Others 
 Mixian — a type of rice noodle from the Yunnan Province, China, made from ordinary non-glutinous rice. In many areas there are at least two distinct thicknesses produced, a thinner form (roughly 1.5 mm or 0.059 inches in diameter) and a thicker form (roughly 3.5–4 mm or 0.14–0.16 inches in diameter).

Pasta made from brown rice flour is also available (in health food stores in Western nations) as an alternative to wheat flour-based noodles for individuals who react poorly to gluten.

Dishes made from rice noodles

Burmese
 Baik kut kyee kaik
 Kat kyi kaik
 Kyar san kyaw — ‘Kyar zan’/‘Kyar san’ means ’thin noodles’ in Burmese, and ’kyaw’ means fried. It is made with thin rice noodles, vermicelli and various vegetables, chicken, pork and seafood.
 Kyay oh
 Meeshay
 Mohinga
 Mont di
 Nan gyi thohk
 Nanbyagyi thoke
 Rakhine kyarzan thoke
 Shan khauk swè (similar to Yunnan mi xian) — a "soup version" of meeshay without gel, and fish sauce instead of soy sauce, with flat or round noodles, where the soup is part of the dish itself, rather than as consommé. Also known as Khaut sew or Shan style noodles, these are, thin noodles served with a peppery soup topped with either chicken or pork and pickled vegetables.

Cambodian
 Kuyteav
 Num banhchok

Chinese
 Beef chow fun
 Cart noodle
 Chao fen — Also known as Chow Fun in many Chinese restaurants in North America
 Clay-Pot Lao Shu Fen
 Crossing-the-bridge noodles
 Laoyou rice noodles
 Luosifen
 Mixian (noodle)
 Rice noodle roll
 Singapore-style noodles

Filipino
Mami bihon
Pancit bihon
Pancit choca
Pancit luglug
Pancit Malabon
Pancit miki-bihon — round egg noodles with bihon, a hybrid type of stir-fried noodle.
Pancit palabok
Pancit sinanta — consists of flat egg noodles, bihon, clams and chicken, with broth colored with annatto and served with pinakufu, a variant of dango

Indonesian
 Bihun
 Bihun goreng
 Bakso
 Ketoprak (dish)
 Kwetiau ayam
 Kwetiau goreng
 Kwetiau kuah
 Kwetiau Medan
 kwetiau sapi
 Lakso
 Soto

Lao
 Feu or Fer
 Khao piak sen
 Khao poon
 Khao soi
 Khua mee / Pad Lao — Savory, sweet, caramelized fried noodles, traditionally topped with a fried egg omelette. It is the equivalent of Pad Thai in Thai cuisine
 Mee ka tee

Malaysian
 Char kway teow
 Kway chap
 Laksa
 Mee siam

South Indian / Sri Lankan
 String Hopper/Idiyappam
 Sevai

Singapore
 Beef kway teow
 Crab bee hoon
 Hokkien mee
 Katong laksa
 Satay bee hoon

Thai
 Khanom chin
 Khao soi
 Kuai chap — it is a soup of pork broth with rolled up rice noodle sheets (resulting in rolls about the size of Italian penne), pork intestines, "blood tofu", and boiled egg.
 Kuai tiao khua kai
 Kuai tiao nam tok - noodle soup darkened with raw blood
 kuaitiao ruea aka boat noodles — Boat noodles have been served since the period of Plaek Phibunsongkhram in 1942, and were originally served from boats that traversed Bangkok's canals. Type of the noodles for boat noodle are several, thin rice noodles, egg noodles, sen yai (wide broad rice noodles), and sen lek (narrow flat rice noodles).
 Mi krop
 Nam ngiao
 Phat khi mao
 Pad thai
 Phat si-io - stir-fried noodles in dark soy sauce
 Rat na - gravy noodles
 Sukhothai rice noodles

Vietnamese
 Bánh canh – Vietnamese soup with thick rice noodles
 Bánh cuốn – sheet of rice flour filled with spiced minced pork and mushroom
 Bánh hỏi
 Bún chả
 Bún bò Huế – rice vermicelli in soup with beef, lemon grass and other ingredients
 Bún kèn  Bún kèn is a rich, fishy, crunchy, sweet and sour concoction that makes use of Phu Quoc island’s abundant seafood and tropical fruit. The fish-based broth also contains coconut milk and lemongrass, giving it a thicker consistency, an amber colour, and a distinctive tang.
 Bún mắm
 Bún ốc
 Bún riêu – rice vermicelli in soup with crab meat
 Bún thịt nướng
 Bún quậy – A seafood noodle soup native to Phu Quoc Island but with roots in the central coastal region of the mainland, bún quậy literally means ‘stirring noodles’.
 Cao lầu
 Gỏi cuốn / Summer roll
 Hủ tiếu – A version of kuay teow that became popular in the 1960s in Southern Vietnam, especially in Saigon. There are different types of noodles for Hu Tieu, such as soft rice noodles, egg noodles, or chewy tapioca noodles.
 Mì Quảng
 Phở

See also 

 Vietnamese cuisine
 Noodle soup

References 

Noodles
Vietnamese cuisine